The Ford Falcon (ED) is a full-size car that was produced by Ford Australia from 1993 to 1994. It was the third iteration of the fifth generation of the Falcon and also included the Ford Fairmont (ED)—the luxury-oriented version.

Introduction 
The Ford ED Falcon was introduced in August 1993,
replacing the Ford EB Falcon, which had been released in July 1991. Although over 280 changes were made for the new model, the most obvious visual difference was a new oval shaped grille. Falcon XR6 and Falcon XR8 models now featured a unique four headlight frontal treatment. It launched shortly after the Holden Commodore VR.

Model range 
The ED Falcon was offered in four-door sedan and five-door wagon body styles in the following models:
 Falcon GLi sedan and wagon
 Falcon Futura sedan and wagon
 Falcon XR6 sedan and wagon
 Falcon XR8 sedan
 Fairmont sedan and wagon
 Fairmont Ghia sedan

The ED Falcon range starts with the GLi, a fleet oriented model. Each GLi had 14-inch steel wheels with wheel covers. Standard features included power steering, adjustable steering column, remote boot lid release, smart-lock remote keyless entry and immobilisation system, AM/FM radio/cassette and plastic fuel tank. GLi models were identified by the dark grey door handles, grille, mirrors and bumper inserts.

The Futura name plate was brought back replacing the "Falcon S" trim. Features the Futura offered over the GLi included body coloured door handles and mirrors, availability of Black Pearl paintwork, demand wash-wipe feature on windscreen wipers (demand wipe only on GLi), ABS brakes, cruise control, full instrumentation pack (four ancillary gauges plus tachometer) with volt meter and oil pressure gauge, digital clock, lamps for ignition lock and map reading, eight-speaker Alpine sound system, carpeted door map pockets on front doors only, full cloth trim. Futura models shared the same engine and transmission options as the GLi with the exceptions of there being no manual transmission and no V8 option on the wagon.

Options on the base models included the choice of 15- or 16-inch (only available with sport suspension package) alloy wheels, sunroof, rear spoiler, cruise controls (GLi), trip computer, cabin fitted hand held fire-extinguisher, smart-lock integrated car alarm and air conditioning.

The Fairmont duo represented the luxury variants of this Falcon series, whilst the XR models were the sports variants.

Limited editions comprised:
 Falcon Classic
 Falcon XR8 Sprint

Production and replacement 
Ford Australia replaced the ED Falcon with the heavily updated Ford Falcon (EF) in August 1994, with ED production having totaled 72,571 units.

See also 
 Ford Falcon (XG) – utility and panel van of the Falcon line running concurrently with the ED series of cars and wagons.

References 

ED
ED Falcon
Cars of Australia
Cars introduced in 1993
Sedans
Station wagons
Rear-wheel-drive vehicles